Luxey is a commune in the Landes department, Nouvelle-Aquitaine, Southwestern France.

See also
Communes of the Landes department
Parc naturel régional des Landes de Gascogne

References

Communes of Landes (department)